The 2010–11 season was Panionios' 50th season in Super League Greece. They also competed in the Greek Cup.

Current squad

Transfers

In

Out

Matches

Super League

First round

Second round

Greek Cup

Top goalscorers
8 goals
 Kostas Mitroglou (8 in Super League)
4 goals
 Boško Balaban (4 in Super League)
3 goals
 Sito Riera (2 in Super League, 1 in Greek Cup)
2 goals
 Dimitris Siovas (2 in Super League)
 Georgios Galitsios (2 in Super League)
1 goal
 Bennard Kumordzi (1 in Super League)
 Ricardo Vaz Tê (1 in Super League)
 Giannis Maniatis (1 in Super League)
 Andreas Samaris (1 in Super League)
 Davor Kukec (1 in Super League)
 Václav Svěrkoš (1 in Super League)
 Fanouris Goundoulakis (1 in Super League)

Panionios F.C. seasons
Panionios